This is a list of electoral district results for the 1974 Queensland state election.

Results by electoral district

Albert

Archerfield

Ashgrove

Aspley

Auburn

Balonne

Barambah

Baroona

Barron River

Belmont

Belyando

Brisbane

Bulimba

Bundaberg

Burdekin

Burnett

Cairns

Callide

Carnarvon

Chatsworth

Clayfield

By-election 

 This by-election was caused by the resignation of John Murray. It was held on 29 May 1976.

Condamine

Cook

Cooroora

Cunningham 

The two candidate preferred vote was not counted between the National and Liberal candidates for Cunningham.

Everton

Fassifern

Flinders

Greenslopes

Gregory

Gympie

Hinchinbrook

Ipswich

Ipswich West

Isis

Ithaca

Kurilpa

Landsborough

Lockyer 

The two candidate preferred vote was not counted between the Liberal and Independent candidates for Lockyer.

By-election 

 This by-election was caused by the resignation of Gordon Chalk. It was held on 16 October 1976.

Lytton

Mackay

Mansfield

Maryborough

Merthyr

Mirani

Mount Coot-tha

Mount Gravatt

Mount Isa

Mourilyan

Mulgrave

Murrumba

Nudgee

Nundah

Pine Rivers

Port Curtis

By-election 

 This by-election was caused by the resignation of Martin Hanson, who died a day later. It was held on 29 May 1976.

 Preferences were not distributed.

Redcliffe

Redlands

Rockhampton

Rockhampton North

Roma

Salisbury

Sandgate

Sherwood

Somerset

South Brisbane

South Coast

Stafford

Surfers Paradise

Toowong

Toowoomba North

Toowoomba South

Townsville

Townsville South

Townsville West

Warrego

Warwick

Wavell

Whitsunday

Windsor

Wolston

Wynnum

Yeronga

See also 

 1974 Queensland state election
 Members of the Queensland Legislative Assembly, 1974-1977

References 

Results of Queensland elections